is a 1987 Japanese historical television series. It is the 25th NHK taiga drama. The broadcast received an average viewer rating of 39.7 percent in the Kanto area.
The drama was adapted from the novel of Sōhachi Yamaoka.

Plot
Toyotomi Hideyoshi unified Japan in 1590, but Date Masamune did not abandon his desire to control the nation.

Production

Original – Sōhachi Yamaoka
Music – Shin’ichirō Ikebe
Historical research – Keizō Suzuki
Sword fight arranger - Kunishirō Hayashi

Cast

Starring role
Ken Watanabe as Date Masamune, the one-eyed dragon
 Ryota Fujima (later Fujima Kanjuro VIII) as Bontenmaru (child Masamune)
 Eiji Shima as Tojiro (pre-teen Masamune)

Date clan
Kin'ya Kitaōji as Date Terumune, Masamune's father
Shima Iwashita as Yoshihime, Masamune's mother
Junko Sakurada as Megohime (adult), Masamune's wife
Kumiko Goto as Megohime (teenager)
Tomokazu Miura as Date Shigezane, Masamune's cousin
Raita Ryū as Date Sanemoto, Shigezane's father
Teruhiko Saigō as Katakura Kojūrō, Masamune's most trusted vassal
Keiko Takeshita as Katakura Kita, Kojūrō's half-sister
Mikiko Otonashi as Tsuta, Kojūrō's wife
Kenichi Okamoto as Date Kojirō, Masamune's younger brother
Kumiko Akiyoshi as Iizaka no Tsubone, also known as Neko Gozen
Yasuko Sawaguchi as Iroha, Masamune's first daughter
Chosuke Ikariya as Oniniwa Sagetsu
Takehiro Murata Oniniwa Tsunamoto
Shigeru Kōyama as Endō Motonobu
Kyōzō Nagatsuka as Rusu Masakage
Mitsuru Hirata as Suzuki Motonobu
Minori Terada as Ōuchi Sadatsuna
Machiko Washio as Ochako
Nobuo Yana as Munefuyu Murata
Shirō Sano as Goto Nobuyasu
Issey Ogata as Kokubu Morishige
Hironobu Nomura as Date Tadamune, Masamune's second son
Michiko Godai as Tose, Shigezane's wife
Muneyuki Satō as Hasekura Tsunenaga

Mogami clan
Yoshio Harada as Mogami Yoshiaki
Imafuku Masao as Mogami Yoshimori
Kaori Sakagami as Komahime, Yoshiaki's second daughter

Toyotomi clan
Shintaro Katsu as Toyotomi Hideyoshi, the ruler of Japan
Kaoru Yachigusa as Nene
Kanako Higuchi as Yodo-dono, Hideyori's mother
Eiji Okuda as Ishida Mitsunari
Kisuke Yamashita as Toyotomi Hideyori, Hideyoshi's son
Maiko Itō as Senhime
Yoichi Hayashi as Asano Nagamasa
Takanori Jinnai as Toyotomi Hidetsugu
Yumiko Nogawa as Asahi no kata
Takaaki Enoki as Ōno Harunaga
Minoru Ōki as Maeda Toshiie
Ken Teraizumi as Gamō Ujisato
Gō Wakabayashi as Sanada Yukimura
Tatsuo Matsumura as Katagiri Katsumoto
Nobuyuki Katsube as Gotō Matabei
Makoto Yuasa as Maeda Gen'i

Tokugawa clan
Masahiko Tsugawa as Tokugawa Ieyasu, the founder and first shogun of the Tokugawa shogunate
Hiroyuki Sanada as Matsudaira Tadateru, Iroha's husband
Hiroshi Katsuno as Tokugawa Hidetada
Shin Takuma as Tokugawa Iemitsu
Junichi Nitta as Yūki Hideyasu
Renji Ishibashi as Yagyū Munenori

Tamura clan
Akira Kubo as Tamura Kiyoaki, Megohime's father
Isao Yamagata as Mukaidate Takumi

Others
Hideji Ōtaki as Kosai Sōitsu
Ryūnosuke Kaneda as Ōkubo Nagayasu
Ryō Ikebe as Sen no Rikyū
Kei Tani as Imai Sōkun
José Cardini as Luis Sotelo
Joe Grace as Sebastián Vizcaíno
Gentarō Ishida as Hatakeyama Yoshitsugu
Hiroshi Arikawa as Shinjō Danjō
Shinichi Tsutsumi as Ashina Yoshihiro
Ryūzaburō Ōtomo as Kubota Jūrō
Shin Aomori as Furukawa Danjō

Television schedule

See also
Sengoku period

References

External links
Official Site 

Taiga drama
1987 Japanese television series debuts
1987 Japanese television series endings
Cultural depictions of Date Masamune
Cultural depictions of Tokugawa Ieyasu
Cultural depictions of Toyotomi Hideyoshi
Television shows written by James Miki
Television shows based on Japanese novels
Television series set in the 16th century
Television series set in the 17th century